In the 2016 season, the Intrust Super Premiership NSWan Australia-based rugby league competition mainly comprising clubs in New South Waleswas won by Illawarra Cutters.

Ladder

Finals Chart

Qualifying And Elimination Finals

1st Qualifying final

2nd Qualifying final

1st Elimination final

2nd Elimination final

Semi-finals

1st Semi-final

2nd Semi-final

Preliminary Finals

1st Preliminary final

2nd Preliminary final

Grand final

References

2016 in Australian rugby league
2016 in New Zealand rugby league
New South Wales Cup